MBC Bollywood is a free-to-air television channel that broadcasts Indian and Pakistani dramas, Bollywood films, and blockbusters premieres. was launched, with great fanfare, on the 26th of October 2013 by Bollywood Superstar “Kareena Kapoor”. A unique launch idea revealed the MBC Bollywood Logo via a grand Bollywood style live performance by Superstar “Kareena Kapoor” on the platform of ‘Arabs Got Talent’.
The channel delivers a fresh approach to Bollywood by offering the region a combination of the newest Bollywood content along with culturally relevant daily drama series and premium celebrity magazine shows from the Indian subcontinent. The content has also been made relevant to the region via an Arabized interface, which is mostly Indian Series dubbed into Arabic, Syrian.
Both entertainment seekers and drama lovers tune in to our unique new wave of Bollywood content that offers a high dose of cultural and social relevance. Moreover, movies and series have all been cherry-picked for originality, significance and relevance to our Arab audiences. By doing this, the channel was able to not only attract the Bollywood Films Subtitled in Arabic fan base, but to a much wider
MBC Bollywood also offers themed nights including Premiere Movie Night (first-run Bollywood movies on Arab TV), Star of the Month (showcasing Bollywood’s biggest icons), New Age Bollywood (movies that break the cliché Bollywood formula), Bollywood Action Nights (thrilling Bollywood experiences) and Romance Nights (soulful music meets serene settings).., MBC BOLLYWOOD (delivering the freshest in Bollywood content geared towards the region via an Arabized interface); It was launched on 26 October 2013. MBC Bollywood is MBC Group's 14th channel, and it is aimed to air 24 hours of Hindi films, either subtitled in Arabic, targeting South Asian audiences, and Arab Bollywood enthusiasts.

Programming

Indian series 
 Bade Achhe Lagte Hain 2 
 Bahu Bagum 
 Beintehaa 
 Bepannah 
 Beyhadh 
 Beyhadh 2 
 Caminho das Índias
 Chittod Ki Rani Padmini Ka Johur 
 Dangerous
 Dawini
 Dil Hi Toh Hai 
 Dil Toh Happy Hai Ji 
 Ek Deewaana Tha
 Ek Hasina Thi
 Ek Bhram Sarvagun Sampanna 
 Ek Duje Ke Vaaste  
 Farah Ki Dawat
 Gathbandhan 
 Ghum Hai Kisikey Pyaar Meiin 
 The Great Indian Global Kitchen
 Hawas Maya
 Ishk Par Zor Nahi 
 Ishq Mein Marjawan 
 Ishq Mein Marjawan 2 
 Ishqbaaaz 
 Iss Pyaar Ko Kya Naam Doon?  
 Iss Pyaar Ko Kya Naam Doon 3 
 Iss Pyaar Ko Kya Naam Doon? Ek Baar Phir 
 Jaana Na Dil Se Door  
 Jeevan Saathi
 Jhalak Dikhhla Jaa
 Jhalak Dikhhla Jaa Reloaded
 Kahaan Hum Kahaan Tum  
 Kasam Tere Pyaar Ki 
 Kasauti Zindagi Kay
 Kasautii Zindagii Kay 2  
 Kuch Rang Pyar Ke Aise Bhi 
 Kitani Mohabbat Hai 
 Mahi Way 
 Mehndi Hai Rachne Waali 
 Namak Issk Ka 
 Rishta.com 
 Saraswatichandra
 Sanjivani
 Sanjivani 2 
 Silsila Badalte Rishton Ka 
 Silsila Pyaar Ka 
 Tu Aashiqui
 Tere Liye 
 Udaariyaan 
 Yadi Bi Yadi
 Yeh Hai Chahatein 
 Yeh Rishta Kya Kehlata Hai 
 Yeh Rishtey Hain Pyaar Ke 
 Yehh Jadu Hai Jinn Ka!  
 Zindagi Ka Har Rang...Gulaal
 Fanna ishq main marjawan 3

Indian entertainment
 Band Baajaa Bride
 BFF's Couch
 BFF's with Vogue
 Bollywood's Most Desirables
 Bollywood Shuffle
 Bollywood Café
 Bollyworld
 Breakfast To Dinner
 Get The Look
 IIFA Buzz
 The Love Laugh Live Show
 My Yellow Table
 Style Addict
 This is My Story

Indian talk shows
 The Anupam Kher Show – Kucch Bhi Ho Sakta Hai
 Koffee with Karan
 Simi Selects India's Most Desirable

Pakistani
Aisi Hai Tanhai
Balaa
Baydardi
Cheekh
Dil-e-Muztar
Dil Lagi
Dushman e Jaan
Gul-o-Gulzar
Humsafar
Ishq Tamasha
Ishqiya
Kadoorat
Kaisa Hai Naseeban
Khaani
Koi Chand Rakh
 Maat
 Mata-e-Jaan Hai Tu
 Mera Naseeb
 Meray Qatil Meray Dildar
Malaal
Mere Paas Tum Ho
Suno Chanda
Suno Chanda 2
Yeh Dil Mera
Qurban
Zindagi Gulzar Hai

Telenovelas
 India: A Love Story

Special events
 Bollywood Fashion Week
 Bollywood Fashion Week Winter Fest
 Filmfare Awards
 IIFA Awards

Films
 7 Din Mohabbat In
 Baaji
 Cake
 The Lift Boy
 The Missing Stone
 Neerja
 Parey Hut Love
 Y

References

External links

Television channels and stations established in 2013
Middle East Broadcasting Center